Centre de Formation à l'Aéronautique Militaire Initiale 5/312 Capitaine Élisabeth Boselli is a French Air and Space Force (Armée de l'air et de l'espace) Initial Military Flight Training Center located at Salon-de-Provence Air Base, Bouches-du-Rhône, France which operates the Cirrus SR20 and the Cirrus SR22.

See also

 List of French Air and Space Force aircraft squadrons

References

French Air and Space Force squadrons